The SNCF Class Z 50000, also known as the 'Francilian', or 'NAT' (for , English: New Rail car Transilien, the project name) is a type of dual-voltage electric multiple unit trainset designed in the 2000s. It is commuter rail system serving Paris and its Île-de-France suburbs on the Transilien network. Departing stations are Gare du Nord, Gare de l'Est and Gare Saint-Lazare.

A total of 360 trainsets have either been built or are under construction by Canadian conglomerate Bombardier at its Crespin, France (near Valenciennes) factory since 2006. The first set was placed into regular passenger service on 14 December 2009.

The name Francilien is also the demonym for people living in Île-de-France.

History 
In 2004, the Syndicat des transports d'Île-de-France (STIF, the transit authority for the Paris region until June 2017) began the tendering process for approximately 180 new electric multiple unit trainsets to replace SNCF's aging single-deck suburban fleet, including trainsets nicknamed “inox” (short for inoxydable, English: stainless [steel]) (Classes Z 5300, Z 6100, Z 6400) and similar push-pull trainsets known as RIB and RIO.

Alstom, Bombardier, and Siemens all submitted bids for the project. In 2006, SNCF (French Railway Company) and Syndicat des transports d'Île-de-France (STIF, the transit authority for the Paris region until June 2017) awarded the contract to Bombardier with a firm order for 172 ‘Francilien’ trainsets at a cost of €1.85 billion, with an option for 200 more.

Bombardier presented the Spacium vehicle at Crespin on 6 February 2009. The first service operated by a Francilien train was on Transilien Line H from Paris Gare du Nord to Luzarches on Sunday 13 December 2009. As of December 2018, 360 trainsets had been ordered, and about 240 were in active service.

Design 
Bombardier vehicle design is articulated using Jakobs bogies between the carriages. Seating is in a 3+2 layout giving over 400 seats in a seven-car unit, over 500 in an eight-car set. The inter-carriage passages have wide, open gangway connections, limiting bottlenecking. All interior lights are provided by light-emitting diodes (LED), so power consumption is lessened. Technical details: SPACIUM Environmental Product Description.

Technical characteristics 
The dual-current capacity (1,500 volts DC and 25,000 volts AC) enables the train to serve the entire Ile-de-France network. Its electrical consumption is 20% lower than that of equipment in circulation in 2009.
The two traction motors per bogie are of the three-phase asynchronous type; they operate at a voltage of 380 volts - 50 hertz.
The motorization is distributed over five motor bogies, located at each end, in line with the driving cabs, and between cars 2 and 3, 3 and 4 and 6 and 7 (in the long version) or 5 and 6 (in the short).

A train is divided into two distinct sets of traction chain, cars 1 to 4 on the one hand and cars 6 to 8 on the other hand. Each of these half-elements has two traction chains in parallel, redundancy which reduces the risk of unavailability in the event of a breakdown. In the event of failure of one of the engine blocks, the other engines are actuated at 100% in order to ensure the normal operation of the train.

The acceleration reaches 0.9 m/s2 for the eight-cell configuration and 1 m/s2 for the seven-cell configuration. The deceleration reaches −1.05 m/s2 during service braking.

Formations 
As of 1 March 2022, 339 Z50000 trainsets (01H to 346L).

8 cars sets 
The 8-cars trainsets are formed as shown below, with five motorised cars and three non-powered trailer cars (5M3T) more precisely with 5 motorized bogies jacobs and 4 trailer bogies.

They are based at the Noisy le Sec (Line E and P), and les Joncherolles /St Denis (Line H and K) depot.

 < or > show a pantograph. Cars 2 and 7 were each equipped with one pantograph.
The car 3  is called ZZ because it is supported by two motorized Jacobs bogies(it's the only intermediate car that's like this)

7 cars sets 

The 7-cars trainsets are formed as shown below, with three motorised cars and two non-powered trailer cars (5M2T) more precisely with 5 motorized bogies jacobs and 3 trailer bogies.

They are based at Levallois (Line L), and le Val Notre Dame/Argenteuil (Line J) depot.

 < or > show a pantograph. Cars 2 and 9 were each equipped with one pantograph.
The car 3  is called ZZ because it is supported by two motorized Jacobs bogies(it's the only intermediate car that's like this)

Fleet
The number of Z50000 trainsets is 339 (at the 1st March 2022) . They are on operations on the E,H,J,K,L and P Line .

Listing Fleet Z50000 (in french)

Photo gallery

See also 
 List of SNCF classes

Notes

References

Literature 
 
 
 
 
 

Z 50000
Bombardier Transportation multiple units
Articulated passenger trains
Electric multiple units of France
Train-related introductions in 2009
25 kV AC multiple units
1500 V DC multiple units of France